Halozercon is a genus of mites in the family Halolaelapidae. There are about five described species in Halozercon.

Species
These five species belong to the genus Halozercon:
 Halozercon barguzin Marchenko, 2018
 Halozercon capitaneus Marchenko, 2019
 Halozercon karacholana Wisniewski et al., 1992
 Halozercon kazachok Marchenko, 2019
 Halozercon tigerek Marchenko, 2019

References

Mesostigmata
Articles created by Qbugbot